Teerthanker Mahaveer University Ground  is a multi-purpose stadium in Moradabad, Uttar Pradesh. The stadium has got facilities for various sports, including cricket, football, and hockey. There are also facilities for indoor sports such as  basketball, badminton, gymnastics, handball, volleyball, lawn tennis,  table tennis, weight lifting and Kabbadi.

The ground is a made considering all norms of BCCI so that it can host Ranji Trophy matches. The stadium hosted its first cricket match in 2012 when the ground hosted a match of Cooch Behar Trophy between Uttar Pradesh Under-19s and Kerala Under-19s. The ground will hosts its first first-class match when Uttar Pradesh cricket team will play against Madhya Pradesh cricket team in 2015–16 Ranji Trophy.

Ranji Trophy matches

References

External links 
 
 Cricketarchive
 Cricinfo

Moradabad
Cricket grounds in Uttar Pradesh
Sports venues in Uttar Pradesh
Multi-purpose stadiums in India
University sports venues in India
Educational institutions in India with year of establishment missing